Kaab or variant, may refer to:

People
 Ka'b (name) also spelled "Kaab"; Arabic and Muslim male given name, surname, and patronymic
 Kaab, an Arabic tribe in Jazira Region, Syria

Places
 Kaaba (aka Kaab), Masjid al-Haram, Mecca, Hejaz, Saudi Arabia, Arabian Peninsula; the black cube
 King Abdulaziz Air Base (KAAB), Dhahran, Eastern, Saudi Arabia
 King Abdullah I Air Base (KAAB), a Royal Jordanian Air Force air base in Amman, Jordan
 King Abdullah II Air Base (KAAB), a Royal Jordanian Air Force air base in Al Ghabawi, Jordan

Groups, organizations, companies
 KAAB AM 1130 kHz (radio station), Batesville, Arkansas, USA
 Studio Kaab, Gangnam, Seoul, South Korea, Korean Peninsula; Korean entertainment company
 Nasiba Bint Kaab Primary Girls (Kaab School), Bahrain; see Lists of girls' schools

Other uses
 Kaab (month), 12th and last month of the Afghan calendar; last month before the vernal equinox

See also

 

 KAB (disambiguation)
 Ka2b, a variant of the Schleicher Ka 2 Rhönschwalbe